Dupelli is a village in Yadadri  district in Telangana, India. It falls under Atmakur mandal.

References

Villages in Nalgonda district